Kanayama Dam is an earthfill dam located in Chiba Prefecture in Japan. The dam is used for irrigation. The catchment area of the dam is 5.5 km2. The dam impounds about 21  ha of land when full and can store 1801 thousand cubic meters of water. The construction of the dam was completed in 1962.

References

Dams in Chiba Prefecture
1962 establishments in Japan